The 2022 Yamaguchi gubernatorial election was held on 6 February 2022 to elect the next governor of , a prefecture of Japan in the Chūgoku region of the main island of Honshu.

Candidates 
Tsugumasa Muraoka, incumbent, endorsed by LDP and Komeito.
Mari Chiba, women's rights activist, endorsed by JCP and SDP.

Results

References 

2022 elections in Japan
Yamaguchi gubernational elections